Heman Lowry (September 4, 1778 - January 5, 1848) was a county, state and federal government official in Vermont.  He was a delegate to two state constitutional conventions (1814, 1828).  Lowry was also the longtime sheriff of Chittenden County (1810-1813, 1815-1827, 1835-1836).  In addition, he served twice as U.S. Marshal for Vermont (1829-1835, 1837-1841).

Life
Lowry was born in North East, New York on September 4, 1778, the son of Thomas Lowry and Phoebe (Benedict) Lowry.  The Lowry family (sometimes spelled Lowrey) moved to Jericho, Vermont in 1789, and after completing his education Lowry became a farmer in Jericho.  Active in politics as a Democratic-Republican, and later as a Democrat, in 1809 he became high bailiff of Chittenden County.  In 1810 he became sheriff and he served until 1813.  He returned to the position in 1815 and served until 1827.  He was Jericho's delegate to the state constitutional convention in 1814, and the delegate from Burlington in 1828.  After moving to Burlington, Lowry owned and operated a farm on Shelburne Road.

In 1829, Lowry was appointed U.S. Marshal for Vermont, a position he held until 1835.  In 1835 and 1836, he again served as sheriff of Chittenden County.  Lowry served as president of the 1836 state Democratic convention and was chosen as a member of the party's state committee.  He was reappointed as Marshal in 1837 and he served until 1841.

Lowry was a delegate to the Democratic state convention in 1841, and president of the party's Chittenden County convention in 1842.  He was also president of the Democratic county convention in July 1843.  In November 1843, Lowry was one of several prominent Vermont Democrats who took part in an event at which the guest of honor was former Vice President Richard M. Johnson, who was campaigning for the party's 1844 presidential nomination.  In 1844 he was one of the organizers of the Chittenden County Agricultural Society.

Lowry died in Burlington on January 5, 1848.  Cemetery records indicate he was buried at Elmwood Cemetery in Burlington.

Family
In 1800, Lowry married Lucy Lee of Jericho.  She died in 1801, and in 1803 he married Margaret Campbell, who died in 1849.  With his first wife, Lowry was the father of daughter Lucy (1801-1854) who died as a resident of the state insane asylum in Brattleboro.

With his second wife, Lowry was the father of:

 Anne (or Ann) (1804-1899), who never married and was a lifelong resident of Burlington
 Julia (1806-1902), the wife of St. John B. L. Skinner, who served as Assistant Postmaster General during the administration of President Ulysses S. Grant
 Thomas (1808-1852)
 George (1809-1869), the longtime Deputy U.S. Collector of Customs for Vermont
 Mary (1811-1898)
 Francis (1814-1902), a career United States Navy officer who attained the rank of captain
 Fanny (1817-1892), a career employee of the United States Post Office Department who worked for several years in the dead letter office
 Heman Jr. (1819-1860), the keeper of the state prison in Dannemora, New York

Notes

References

Sources

Books

Magazines

Newspapers

Internet

1778 births
1848 deaths
People from Burlington, Vermont
Vermont Democratic-Republicans
Vermont sheriffs
United States Marshals
Burials in Vermont
People from North East, New York